In Front of Your Face is a 2021 South Korean drama film written and directed by Hong Sang-soo. The film was selected to be shown in the Cannes Premiere section at the 2021 Cannes Film Festival.

Cast
 Lee Hye-young as Sang ok
 Jo Yoon-hee as Jeong ok
 Kwon Hae-hyo  as Jae won
 Shin Seok-ho as Seung-won
 Kim Sae-byuk as old house owner 
 Ha Seong-guk as assistant director 
 Seo Young-hwa as passerby
 Lee Eun-mi as passerby
 Kang Yi-seo as Seung-won's girlfriend

Release and reception
The film was selected for screening in the 'Icon' category at 26th Busan International Film Festival, held from 6 to 15 October 2021.

The review aggregator website Rotten Tomatoes reported a 93% approval rating, based on 14 reviews with an average rating of 7.70/10.

Accolades

References

External links
 
 
 

2021 films
2021 drama films
South Korean drama films
2020s Korean-language films
Films directed by Hong Sang-soo